Konstanty Kazimierz Brzostowski (1644–1722) was a Polish noble, count of the Holy See, and papal prelate. He was Grand Secretary of Lithuania from 1671, and shortly thereafter was Grand Writer of Lithuania. He was bishop of Smoleńsk from 1685 to 1687 and bishop of Vilnius from 1687.

Konstanty studied at the Wilno ecclesiastical seminary and in Rome (1657-1659).  He became a member of the Wilno Chapter in 1669.

In 1689, Konstanty was one of the judges who sentenced Kazimierz Łyszczyński to death for atheism. Brzostowski was a political opponent of the Sapieha family and excommunicated the Grand Hetman of Lithuania Jan Kazimierz Sapieha the Younger in 1694 and again in 1709.  He unsuccessfully tried to make Peter I of Russia adopt more tolerant policies towards the followers of Union of Brest.

Konstanty Brzostowski was known as "the quarrelsome bishop".

References

External links 
 Bishop Konstanty Kazimierz Brzostowski

1644 births
1722 deaths
Bishops of Vilnius
Bishops of Smolensk
Abbots of Mogiła
17th-century Roman Catholic bishops in the Polish–Lithuanian Commonwealth
18th-century Roman Catholic bishops in the Polish–Lithuanian Commonwealth